Tanzhou is a town situated at the southern extremity of the prefecture-level city of Zhongshan, Guangdong province. The population of Tanzhou is of  residents.

See also
Shatian dialect

External links
Tanzhou Government Website

Zhongshan
Township-level divisions of Guangdong